Candolleodendron brachystachyum is a species of flowering plant in the legume family, Fabaceae. It belongs to the subfamily Faboideae. It is the only member of the genus Candolleodendron.

References

Swartzieae
Monotypic Fabaceae genera